Nodicostellaria is a genus of sea snails, marine gastropod mollusks, in the family Costellariidae, the ribbed miters.

Species
Species within the genus Nodicostellaria include:
 Nodicostellaria crassa (Simone, 1995)
 Nodicostellaria kaicherae (Petuch, 1979)
 Nodicostellaria kremerae Petuch, 1987
 Nodicostellaria laterculata (G. B. Sowerby II, 1874)

References

Costellariidae
Monotypic gastropod genera